Ties Elzerman (born 30 April 1995) is a Dutch swimmer. He competed in the men's 50 metre breaststroke at the 2019 World Aquatics Championships.

References

External links
 

1995 births
Living people
Place of birth missing (living people)
Dutch male breaststroke swimmers
20th-century Dutch people
21st-century Dutch people